Domitius menozzii  is an araneomorph spider species of the family Nesticidae. It occurs in Italy, where it can be found in caves. It was described by Ludovico di Caporiacco in 1934 (as Nesticus menozzii).

Description
Male body length is 5.2 mm with a prosoma length of 2.2 mm. Female body length is 6.5 mm with a prosoma length of 2.3 mm. Body colouration is a uniform, pale brown. The anterior median eyes are very reduced.

Original publication

References 

Nesticidae
Spiders described in 1934
Spiders of Europe